Haemophilus felis is a Gram-negative species of bacterium of the family Pasteurellaceae. A strain of this species was originally isolated from the respiratory tract of a cat with chronic obstructive pulmonary disease, though it was also found in healthy cats. The species may be closely related (on the basis of rpoB sequence) to Pasteurella multocida.

References

External links
Type strain of Haemophilus felis at BacDive -  the Bacterial Diversity Metadatabase

felis
Gram-negative bacteria
Cat diseases
Bacteria described in 1999